Apthoroblattina is an extinct genus of primitive cockroaches from the Carboniferous period.  Fossils of the genus have been found in England, Wales, the United States, and Russia.  The paratype specimen for the species, A. johnsoni, is recorded to have a total length of 43 mm and a width of 38 mm, while the type specimens of A. sulcata is noted to have been up to 45 mm in length and 25 mm in width if complete.

References

Prehistoric insects of Europe
Fossil taxa described in 1906